Minuscule 201 (in the Gregory-Aland numbering), δ 403 (Soden), is a Greek minuscule manuscript of the New Testament, on parchment. Palaeographically it has been assigned to the 11th century. It has marginalia.

Description 

The codex contains entire text of the New Testament on 493 parchment leaves (size ). The Pauline epistles are followed after the Catholic epistles. The text is written in two columns per page, in 22 lines per page, in light-brown or dark-brown ink, the initial letters in gold.

There is also another division according to the Ammonian Sections, with some references to the Eusebian Canons.

According to colophons, Gospel of Matthew was written in 8 years after Ascension, Mark – 10 years, Luke 15 years, and John 32 years.

Text 

The Greek text of the codex is a representative of the Byzantine text-type. Hermann von Soden classified it to the textual family Kr. Aland placed it in Category V. Its text is very close to the codex 480.

According to the Claremont Profile Method it represents textual family Kr in Luke 1, Luke 10, and Luke 20, as its perfect member.

History 

According to the colophon from Epistle to Hebrews the manuscript was written by scribe named Methodius (in 6866): 
ετελειωθη μηνι οικτοβφιω ζ ινδικτιωνη ια ετους ςωξς. Μεθοδιε χειρ τω θυτορακενδυτου
Formerly the manuscript belonged to the monastery S. Marco in Florence. Later it belonged to Samuel Butler Bishop of Lichfield.

Giovanni Lami was the first who described the manuscript. It was examined by Wettstein, Birch, Griesbach, Bloomfield, Scrivener, and C. R. Gregory (1883). Griesbach placed it twice on his list of manuscripts of NT, as 107 and 201.

It is currently housed at the British Library (Add MS 11837) in London.

See also 

 List of New Testament minuscules
 Biblical manuscript
 Textual criticism

References

Further reading 

 Giovanni Lami, De eruditione apostolorum, Florence 1738, p. 218-221.
 Catalogue of Additions to the Manuscripts in the British Museum, 1841-1845 (London, 1850), 1841, p. 10.
 Henri Omont, Notes sur les manuscrits grecs du British Museum, Bibliothèque de l'École des Chartes, 45 (1884), p. 345 (p. 34 in the offprint, which is paginated 1-40).
 F. H. A. Scrivener, A Full and Exact Collation of About 20 Greek Manuscripts of the Holy Gospels (Cambridge and London, 1852), p. XLIV-XLVI. (as m)
 F. H. A. Scrivener, An Exact Transcript of the Codex Augiensis (Cambridge and London, 1859), p. 63. (as h)

External links 

 Minuscule 201 at the Encyclopedia of Textual Criticism 
 Add MS 11837 at the British Library

Greek New Testament minuscules
11th-century biblical manuscripts
British Library additional manuscripts